187 Ride or Die is a video game for the PlayStation 2 and Xbox, developed and published by Ubisoft. It is a vehicular combat racing game and was released for the PS2 and Xbox before being ported to the PlayStation Portable under the title Street Riders.

Gameplay
In order to become "top dog" of the game, the player must race and defeat opponents through a variety of different stages all set in Los Angeles's infamous South Central region. If playing with another player, one can be the driver and the other can be the shooter (co-op). This can be done in the story and online mode. There are a variety of modes available to the player.

Reception

187 Ride or Die received mixed reviews on both platforms according to the review aggregation website Metacritic.

References

External links

 

2005 video games
Racing video games
PlayStation 2 games
Xbox games
Ubisoft games
Organized crime video games
Video games set in Los Angeles
Multiplayer and single-player video games
Vehicular combat games
Video games developed in France